Just Dance 2 is a 2010 dance rhythm game developed by Ubisoft Paris and Ubisoft Milan and published by Ubisoft. The game was released exclusively for the Wii on October 12, 2010, in North America and in Australia and Europe on October 14, 2010, as a sequel to Just Dance and the second main installment of the series.

Just Dance 2 focused primarily on improvements and enhancements to the original game, including the addition of new co-operative "Duet" routines, a team-based "Dance Battle" mode, a "Non-Stop Shuffle" mode, a new exergaming-oriented mode known as "Just Sweat", and paid downloadable content.

Just Dance 2 was released to positive reviews, with critics praising the game for its noticeable quality improvements in comparison to the original Just Dance, its new features and modes, and its continued positioning as a multiplayer "party game" experience accessible to a casual audience. As of January 2011, Just Dance 2 had sold over 5 million copies, making it the third best-selling third-party Wii title, and the second best selling game in the series, behind the sequel, Just Dance 3, which is also the best selling third party Wii game.

Gameplay 

The gameplay of Just Dance 2 remains similar to the original; while holding a Wii Remote in their right hand, players must mimic the routine of an on-screen dancer to a chosen song. The dancers of each song now wear a colored glove for better motion detection. Players are judged based on their accuracy, scoring points. Players can choose between the full version and the short version. Unlike the first game, there are no animated score icons, instead, there are different on-screen names for players to choose from. Also, there are four judgements for regular moves, the "X" and "OK" judgements remain the same and the two new judgements are "Good" and "Perfect". While the "X" has the same meaning as the previous game, "OK" now means that the player tried, but isn't quite there, "Good" means that the player is almost there, and "Perfect" means the same as "Great" in the previous game. All of the shake moves have been replaced with gold moves, where instead of shaking their Wii Remotes, all of the players have to follow the gold pictograms. If a player doesn't get the gold move, they get an "X". If the player does an awesome job on the gold move, they get a "Yeah" and bonus points. In addition to these new features, players receive rating out of 5 stars as well as the "Gold Move" motive (from the number of gold moves done) and the "On Fire" motive (from mostly Goods and Perfects in a row) at the end of the song.

Selected songs offer "Duet" modes, which feature choreography designed for two players. The lyrics are in the middle of the two dancers, and pictograms are on the left and right sides of the lyrics. The odd-numbered players always get the left-sided dancer, while the even-numbered players always get the right-sided one. A new mode known as "Dance Battle" was also introduced; it is a team-based mode in which players compete across a series of songs and minigames to earn points for their team. The mode can be played by up to eight players, divided into two teams of four. Minigames in this mode include "Simon Says" and "Race". "Medleys" are videos showing short segments from five random songs switching over one by one. A new song-shuffling gameplay mode known as "Non-Stop Shuffle" was introduced as well; it is a mode where songs are played in a random order without selecting a song from the soundtrack.

A new exercise-focused gameplay mode known as "Just Sweat" was also added; the mode is designed to serve as a daily exercise regiment, allowing one player at a time to select an intensity-based selection of songs. Activity in Just Sweat mode is gauged using "sweat points".

Track list 
The game features 48 songs, and additional downloadable content (DLC).

Note: All DLC is no longer available for purchase due to the removal Wii Points on March 26, 2018 and the shutdown of the Wii Shop Channel on January 30, 2019. However, most of those are still found on the Just Dance: Summer Party disc.

Reception 

Critics suggested Just Dance 2 would be a good competitor with a similar motion-control dance game by Harmonix, Dance Central (2010), in that the purchase of an expensive Kinect camera wasn't required.

Just Dance 2 was commended for being a great social experience with friends, which was frequently attributed to its choreography described as "goofy," "absolutely ridiculous," "silly," "ludicrous," and filled with "playful touches," "comical spins, jumps, and crossovers." Explained Keza MacDonald of IGN, "The measure of any social video game is the memorable moments they create – the evenings (or wee small drunken hours) spent floundering in the face of doing the robot to Satisfaction, watching a friend topple head-over-arse attempting Ra-Ra-Rasputin's cossack dancing, the mildly awkward moment in the middle of The Shoop Shoop Song where you accidentally meet your duet partner's eyes." A common highlight was the ballet dance segment in "A-Punk"'s choreography; Wrote Martin Gaston of Video Gamer, "there is simply no way for two fat men to look cool when trying to pirouette around each other in Vampire Weekend's A-Punk, for instance, but seeing as it's so outlandish you don't have to worry about looking like a pleb."
 
In addition the variety of choreographies and songs, the addition of new modes (especially towards the "Duet"), a download store, and improvements in motion control detection and presentation (specifically the "much less amateurish" score meters and incorporation of animated backgrounds,) were praised. Opined Martin Gaston of Video Gamer,  In describing how Just Dance 2 differentiated itself from other dance games, IGN explained, "many dance games recycle the same old moves for every song, but not this. The dancers on-screen are even decked out in appropriate gear: swaying wigs, robot suits, flares, canes and even bobble hats."

Problems from the first Just Dance game were noted. Motion controls were claimed to still be imprecise sometimes, Nintendo Life reporting its reporters "experienced more than a few dance battles with questionable end results." Additionally, "there's almost nothing for a solo player to do," wrote Will Holdsworth. Some critics also found the DLC song prices a little too high.

Sales of Just Dance 2 surpassed those of the original; with over 5 million copies as of January 2011, it was the best-selling third-party title for the Wii. Laurent Detoc, CEO of Ubisoft's North American operations, stated that this achievement "[solidified] the Just Dance brand as a pop culture phenomenon."

Other release 

A Best Buy Edition (titled Just Dance 2: Special Edition in-game) was released in North America which included three exclusive songs which are The Clash's "Should I Stay or Should I Go", Lipps Inc.'s "Funkytown" (covered by Sweat Invaders in-game) and A. R. Rahman and The Pussycat Dolls' "Jai Ho (You Are My Destiny)" featuring Nicole Scherzinger.

References

External links 
 

2010 video games
Dance video games
Fitness games
Music video games
Just Dance (video game series)
Ubisoft games
Wii games
Wii-only games
Video games developed in France
Video games developed in Italy
Multiplayer and single-player video games